Generator is the fourth studio album by the Italian industrial black metal band Aborym.  Former vocalist Attila Csihar makes a guest appearance on this album, performing vocals on "Man Bites God". Vocals on the rest of the album are performed by Prime Evil.

This is Aborym's first album to feature a human drummer as opposed to a drum machine.  It is also the last to feature longtime guitarist Nysrok Infernalien.

Track listing

Credits
 Malfeitor Fabban - bass, synth
 Prime Evil - vocals
 Nysrok Infernalien - guitar, synth
 Faust - drums

Special Guests
Attila Csihar - vocals on "Man Bites God"
Richard K. Szabo 
Cultoculus - Backing Vocals
Jiehna Ycosahateron - Noise Addiction

References 

2006 albums
Aborym albums
Season of Mist albums